Fantastic Planet Revisited is the third studio album by DIN, released on July 2, 1996 by Hypnotic Records.

Track listing

Personnel
Adapted from the Fantastic Planet Revisited liner notes.

DIN
 Jean-Claude Cutz (as Din, Pupka Frey and Oliver Cutz) – organ, percussion, arrangements, producer

Additional performers
 Arthur Oskan – synthesizer

Production and design
 Gérard Bélanger – executive-producer
 Disco Monica – photography, art director
 Willy Idol – art director
 Rob Stuart – mastering, editing
 King Svenie – cover art, illustrations, design

Release history

References

External links 
 Fantastic Planet Revisited at Discogs (list of releases)
 Fantastic Planet Revisited at iTunes

1996 albums
DIN (musician) albums
Hypnotic Records albums